The 2017 season was Bodø/Glimt's first season back in the OBOS-ligaen since 2013. Bodø/Glimt finished the season as Champions, earning promotion back to the Tippeligaen, whilst in the Norwegian Cup, they reached the Third Round before defeat to Elverum.

Squad

Transfers

In

Loans in

Out

Released

Competitions

OBOS-ligaen

Results summary

Results by round

Results

Table

Norwegian Cup

Squad statistics

Appearances and goals

|-
|colspan="14"|Players away from Bodø/Glimt on loan:
|-
|colspan="14"|Players who appeared for Bodø/Glimt no longer at the club:

|}

Goal scorers

Clean sheets

Disciplinary record

References

FK Bodo Glimt
FK Bodø/Glimt seasons